The Oldstone Conference of 11 to 14 April 1949 was the third of three postwar conferences held to discuss quantum physics; arranged for the National Academy of Sciences by J. Robert Oppenheimer, who was again chairman. It followed the Shelter Island Conference of 1947 and the Pocono Conference of 1948. There were 24 participants; new participants were Robert Christie, Freeman Dyson (whose writings explained Feynman’s ideas), George Placzek, and Hideki Yukawa.

Held at Oldstone-on-the-Hudson in Peekskill, New York, the main talking-point was Richard Feynman’s approach to quantum electrodynamics (QED); Feynman was now (at 30) the leading physicist of his generation.

References 

Physics conferences
History of science and technology in the United States
Foundational quantum physics
1949 in science
1949 in the United States
1949 conferences
Science events in the United States
April 1949 events in the United States